Dr. Cyclops is a 1940 American science fiction horror film from Paramount Pictures, produced by Dale Van Every and Merian C. Cooper, directed by Ernest B. Schoedsack, and starring Thomas Coley, Victor Kilian, Janice Logan, Charles Halton, Frank Yaconelli, and Albert Dekker.

The film was nominated for an Oscar for Best Visual Effects (by Farciot Edouart and Gordon Jennings) at the 13th Academy Awards.

Fantasy and science fiction writer Henry Kuttner wrote a novelette adapting the film's story that appeared in the June 1940 issue of the pulp magazine Thrilling Wonder Stories.

Plot
A scientist attempts to shrink all of humanity to reduce our impact on the environment. Biologists Dr. Mary Robinson and Dr. Rupert Bulfinch are summoned by Dr. Alexander Thorkel to his remote laboratory in the Peruvian jungle. They are accompanied by mineralogist Bill Stockton, a last minute substitute for another scientist (and who needs money to pay his IOUs), and Steve Baker, who wants to make sure his hired mules are well cared for (and suspects Thorkel may have discovered a rich mine). When they arrive, Thorkel asks the scientists to describe a specimen in his microscope, since his eyesight is too poor for him to do so himself. Bill identifies iron crystal contamination, much to Thorkel's satisfaction. Then, to their astonishment, Thorkel thanks them for their services and wants them to leave.

Insulted that they have traveled thousands of miles for nothing, they set up camp in Thorkel's stockade, insisting that he tell them more about his research. While snooping around, Steve discovers the area is rich with pitchblende, an ore of uranium and radium. When he finds them looking around his laboratory, Thorkel becomes angry, but as he is outnumbered, reveals he is shrinking living creatures, among them a horse, using radiation piped from a radium deposit down a deep shaft. He invites them and his assistant Pedro Caroz to examine his apparatus, then locks them inside his radiation chamber. With the information that Bill has provided, he is able to correct the flaw that has killed his prior specimens. When his victims awaken, they find they have shrunk to twelve inches tall.

They flee from Thorkel, and then from Thorkel's cat Satanus, from whom they are saved by Pedro's dog Tipo, who is bewildered by his master now being smaller than him. Bulfinch is eventually coaxed into speaking with Thorkel, but the latter is not interested in negotiating, merely in measuring Bulfinch. When he discovers that Bulfinch is growing, he realizes that the effect is only temporary. He murders Bulfinch in cold blood and sets out to hunt the others down so that they cannot go to the authorities.

The four survivors hack their way through gigantic jungle foliage and do battle with the wildlife. They attempt to launch Pedro's small boat (now enormous in their eyes), but are attacked by a caiman. When Thorkel locates them using Pedro's dog, Pedro leads Thorkel away from the others and is shot dead. The fugitives hide in one of Thorkel’s specimen cases and are brought back undetected to his lab.

While Thorkel goes outside to adjust a machine, Bill, Steve and Mary prepare to kill him with his own shotgun when he lies down on his bed. However, he instead falls asleep at his desk. They hide his spare glasses, then Steve steals the pair Thorkel put on his desk, managing to smash one lens before Thorkel awakes. Thorkel chases the shrunken trio to the mineshaft and precariously hangs by a rope when the plank he was lying on breaks. Steve cuts the rope, causing Thorkel to plunge to his death.

Months later, Bill, Steve and Mary return to civilization, restored to their original size. Bill and Mary are in love.

Cast

 Albert Dekker as Dr. Alexander Thorkel
 Thomas Coley as Bill Stockton
 Janice Logan as Dr. Mary Robinson
 Charles Halton as Dr. Rupert Bulfinch
 Victor Kilian as Steve Baker
 Frank Yaconelli as Pedro Caroz
 Paul Fix as Dr. Mendoza
 Frank Reicher as Professor Kendall

Production
Dr. Cyclops was directed by Ernest B. Schoedsack, responsible a few years earlier for  King Kong. Like that film, Dr. Cyclops features elaborate sets and special effects. It is the first American horror film made in full, three-strip Technicolor; Doctor X (1932) and Mystery of the Wax Museum (1933) were made using the earlier two-color process. Schoedsack took special care to make certain that the color effects were believable.

Reception

Critical response
Variety gave the film a negative review, calling the film "dull" and criticizing the film's direction, story, and jumbled ideas. TV Guide awarded the film a mixed two out of four stars, noting the film's "novel" special effects, but felt that the film 'wasted the opportunity to explore its subject'.

Time Out London gave the film a mostly positive review, calling it "An engaging fantasy with brilliantly executed (though mostly rather unimaginative) special effects which look back to The Devil Doll and forward to The Incredible Shrinking Man. Let down by a dull supporting cast, but retrieved by the attractively pale, tremulous Technicolor." Dennis Schwartz from Ozus' World Movie Reviews rated the film a grade B+, commending Dekker's performance while also noting that the film was "one of those bad films that is good because it's so much fun, and its noteworthy trick photography is effectively used for its dazzling special effects--way before the use of CGI".

Film historian John Brosnan has written of Dr. Cyclops: "It's a fast-paced, inventive film though the dialogue is awful and the acting is undistinguished with the exception of Albert Dekker's portrayal of Dr Thorkel. As with Charles Laughton's version of Dr. Moreau, his evil is not a byproduct of scientific zeal but a deliberate choice of action. The special effects deserve a mention, being ingeniously contrived and rather convincing, but the film is also noteworthy for its two unintentional references to the war that was about to engulf the world and end with the prospect of a nuclear apocalypse - Thorkel draws the power for his device from a 'radium mine' and, with his shaven head and thick, round glasses, he resembles the wartime caricature of the 'beastly Jap'".

Home media
Universal Studios Home Entertainment released it on DVD in 2007 as part of a boxed set called The Classic Sci-Fi Ultimate Collection Vol. 2, along with The Land Unknown, The Leech Woman, The Deadly Mantis and Cult of the Cobra.

See also
List of films featuring miniature people

References

External links

 
 
 
 
 

1940 horror films
1940 films
American science fiction horror films
1940s science fiction horror films
Films about size change
Films directed by Ernest B. Schoedsack
Films set in Peru
Paramount Pictures films
Films scored by Ernst Toch
Mad scientist films
1940s American films